John David Carson (born John Franklin Carson; March 6, 1952 – October 27, 2009) was an American actor. He was born in Los Angeles, California.

Career
Carson began his career at a young age, acting in television advertisements, and later doing cartoon voice-acting for Hanna-Barbera. His first job was the voice of "Dino Boy/Todd" in 18 episodes of "Space Ghost" from 1966-1968, billed as Johnny Carson. He attended Los Angeles Valley College where he played a lead role in its 1969 production of The Taming Of The Shrew. Upon beginning his Hollywood career he was immediately engaged in a dispute with Johnny Carson over the use of their shared name - he subsequently went by the name John David Carson.

Carson's first feature film was Pretty Maids All in a Row in 1971. Carson portrayed "Ponce de Leon Harper", a nerdy and sexually inexperienced young man who is tormented with lust at the pretty young women around him at school and suffers from chronic priapism. Ponce is eventually "mentored" by his guidance counselor, played by Rock Hudson, an expert at seducing younger women, who takes him under his wing and persuades an attractive female teacher (played by Angie Dickinson) to sleep with him. Another notable role was in the 1976 film Stay Hungry, alongside Arnold Schwarzenegger, Jeff Bridges and Sally Field. Carson also appeared in a great deal of television productions, including Hawaii Five-O and Charlie's Angels. He portrayed "Jay Spence" on Falcon Crest, a prime-time soap opera.

He played "Larry Burns", a television repairman who is briefly framed for a woman's murder by a corrupt sheriff on Murder She Wrote and an Irish jockey named "Kevin Ryan" on Charlie's Angels. He appeared in various B-movies such as Empire of the Ants (1977), an adaptation of an H. G. Wells story about gigantic, man-eating ants, Creature from Black Lake (1976), Charge of the Model T's (1977) and The Fifth Floor (1978), and acted alongside George C. Scott in The Day of the Dolphin (1973). He again appeared opposite Scott, playing his character's son, in The Savage is Loose (1974).  Carson continued acting in small parts until 1990, appearing in the Julia Roberts hit Pretty Woman, which marked his last appearance on film. He voluntarily retired from acting after this role.

Personal life
John Franklin Carson was of Irish and Cherokee ancestry, the son of Western actor Eldridge "Kit" Carson (1909–1978) and his wife, Rosemonde (née James) Carson, a fashion model. He was born on March 6, 1952, at the now-closed Queen of Angels Hospital in Los Angeles.  The home where his parents resided and where he lived as a child was located at 634 North Fuller Avenue.

Carson entered Hollywood from a theater background; at the time of his arrival on the motion-picture scene, he had already undergone several traumatic incidents. His parents had split; furthermore, he had been involved in a serious motorcycle accident which left him almost completely deaf in one ear, according to an interview in Interview.

Marriages
Carson was raised as a Christian Scientist. He married Vicki Morgan on January 10, 1976, and the two divorced the following year. He married for a second time to Colette Trygg; that marriage also ended in divorce on May 7, 1993.  He and his third wife, Diana, were married on February 5, 2007. They remained married until his death from lymphoma on October 27, 2009 at age 57. Carson had two step-daughters, Amber and Alana, from his wife's previous marriage.  Although he never legally changed his name from his birth name of John Franklin Carson to his professional name of John David Carson, he was married three times and listed his name on his marriage applications as John David Carson.

Filmography

References

External links

1952 births
2009 deaths
Deaths from lymphoma
Deaths from cancer in Nevada
American male film actors
American people of Cherokee descent
American people of Irish descent
American Christian Scientists
Male actors from Los Angeles
People from North Hollywood, Los Angeles
20th-century American male actors